FPJ may refer to
 Fernando Poe Jr. (1939–2004), Filipino actor
 The Free Press Journal, an Indian newspaper
 Foreign Policy Journal, an online publication